Hugo León Ferrer is a Colombian television producer best known for his association with Telemundo and RTI Colombia.  He is a former vice-president of production at RTI.  His credits include the 1996 version of La Viuda de Blanco, Pasión de Gavilanes, La Tormenta, Sin Vergüenza, Zorro and Madre Luna.

Trayectory 
Production Director - Telemundo-RTI Producciones

La Reina del Sur (Telenovela) (2010/11)
Executive Producer - Telemundo-RTI Producciones

Flor Salvaje (2011/12)
Los Herederos Del Monte (2010/11)
Ojo Por Ojo (2010/11)
La Diosa Coronada (2010)
El Clon (2010)
Bella Calamidades (2009/10)
Niños Ricos, Pobres Padres (2009)
Victorinos (2009/10)
Doña Bárbara (2008/09)
Sin Senos No Hay Paraíso (2008/09)
La Traición (2008)
Victoria (2007/08)
Madre Luna (2007)
Sin Vergüenza (2007)
Zorro: La Espada y la Rosa (2007)
Amores de mercado (Amores) (2006)
La Tormenta (2005/06)
La mujer en el espejo (2004/05)
Te Voy a Enseñar a Querer (2004/05)
Pasión de gavilanes (2003/04)
La Venganza (2002/03)
Luzbel esta de visita (2001/02)
Amantes del desierto (2001)
executive producer
Yo amo a Paquita Gallego (1998)
La Viuda de Blanco (1996)
Maria Bonita (1995)

External links

American television producers
Living people
Year of birth missing (living people)